Podomyrma is a genus of ants in the subfamily Myrmicinae.

Species

Podomyrma abdominalis Emery, 1887
Podomyrma adelaidae (Smith, 1858)
Podomyrma alae Donisthorpe, 1949
Podomyrma albertisi Emery, 1887
Podomyrma basalis Smith, 1859
Podomyrma bispinosa Forel, 1901
Podomyrma carinata Donisthorpe, 1947
Podomyrma chasei Forel, 1901
Podomyrma christae (Forel, 1907)
Podomyrma clarki (Crawley, 1925)
Podomyrma delbrueckii Forel, 1901
Podomyrma densestrigosa Viehmeyer, 1924
Podomyrma elongata Forel, 1895
Podomyrma femorata Smith, 1859
Podomyrma ferruginea (Clark, 1934)
Podomyrma formosa (Smith, 1858)
Podomyrma gastralis Emery, 1897
Podomyrma gibbula Viehmeyer, 1914
Podomyrma gratiosa (Smith, 1858)
Podomyrma grossestriata Forel, 1915
Podomyrma inermis Mayr, 1876
Podomyrma keysseri Viehmeyer, 1914
Podomyrma kitschneri (Forel, 1915)
Podomyrma kraepelini Forel, 1901
Podomyrma laevifrons Smith, 1859
Podomyrma laevissima Smith, 1863
Podomyrma lampros Viehmeyer, 1924
Podomyrma libra (Forel, 1907)
Podomyrma macrophthalma Viehmeyer, 1925
Podomyrma maculiventris Emery, 1887
Podomyrma maligna (Smith, 1865)
Podomyrma marginata (McAreavey, 1949)
†Podomyrma mayri Emery, 1891
Podomyrma micans Mayr, 1876
Podomyrma minor Donisthorpe, 1949
Podomyrma mjobergi (Forel, 1915)
Podomyrma muckeli Forel, 1910
Podomyrma novemdentata Forel, 1901
Podomyrma obscurior Forel, 1915
Podomyrma octodentata Forel, 1901
Podomyrma odae Forel, 1910
Podomyrma omniparens (Forel, 1895)
Podomyrma overbecki Viehmeyer, 1924
Podomyrma pulchella Donisthorpe, 1938
Podomyrma ruficeps Smith, 1863
Podomyrma rugosa (Clark, 1934)
Podomyrma silvicola Smith, 1860
Podomyrma simillima Smith, 1860
Podomyrma testacea Donisthorpe, 1949
Podomyrma tristis Karavaiev, 1935
Podomyrma turneri (Forel, 1901)
Podomyrma vidua Santschi, 1932

References

External links

Myrmicinae
Ant genera